The Sacramento Kings are an American professional basketball team based in Sacramento, California. The Kings play in the Pacific Division of the Western Conference in the National Basketball Association (NBA). The team was founded as the Rochester Royals by Lester Harrison and his brother Jack Harrison in Rochester, New York in 1945. The Royals won the National Basketball League (NBL) championship during their inaugural season by defeating the Sheboygan Red Skins 3–0. In 1948, the team joined the Basketball Association of America (BAA), which merged with the NBL to become the NBA a year later. The franchise won its first NBA championship in the 1951 NBA Finals under the coaching of Lester Harrison. The Harrison brothers moved the team to Cincinnati, Ohio in 1957 due to poor attendance. After spending 15 years in Cincinnati, the team was purchased by a group of businessmen from Kansas City, who moved the team to Kansas City and renamed it to the Kings in 1972. The team was briefly named the Kansas City-Omaha Kings from 1972 to 1975 when home games were split between two cities. In 1982, the franchise was bought by a Sacramento-based group and became the Sacramento Kings.

There have been 28 head coaches for the franchise since joining the NBA. Rick Adelman is the franchise's all-time leader in regular season games coached (624), regular season games won (395), playoff games coached (69), and playoff games won (34). Harrison, Bobby Wanzer, Ed Jucker, Bob Cousy, Draff Young, Jerry Reynolds, Reggie Theus, and Kenny Natt have spent their entire NBA head coaching careers with the Kings. Wanzer, Tom Marshall, Jack McMahon, Cousy, Larry Staverman, Adelman and Theus formerly played for the Kings. The Kings are currently owned by Vivek Ranadivé, with former Rockets executive Monte McNair as the general manager and Mike Brown is the head coach.

Key

Coaches

The list does not include NBL seasons.

Notes
 A running total of the number of coaches of the Royals/Kings. Thus, any coach who has two or more separate terms as head coach is only counted once.
 Each year is linked to an article about that particular NBA season.

References
General

Specific

Lists of National Basketball Association head coaches by team

Head coaches